Ferrières-en-Bray (literally Ferrières in Bray) is a commune in the Seine-Maritime department in the Normandy region in northern France.

Geography
The commune forms part of the border with the region of Picardy.

Population

Places of interest
 The Château Le Manais, built in 1730.
 The church of St.Martin, dating from the sixteenth century.
 The Danone factory, where Charles Gervais started the company in the 19th century.

See also
Communes of the Seine-Maritime department

References

External links

 Ferrières-en-Bray municipal website 

Communes of Seine-Maritime